John Saltmarsh may refer to:
John Saltmarsh (historian) (1908–1974), British historian
John Saltmarsh (priest) (died 1647), radical English clergyman